Paracymoriza albalis is a moth in the family Crambidae. It was described by Yoshiyasu in 1987. It is found in Thailand.

References

Acentropinae
Moths described in 1987